Mataika Tuicakau was a Fijian track and field athlete who competed in the shot put and discus throw events.

Born on Tovu, Totoya on the Lau Islands of Fiji, Tuicakau was a tall athlete who excelled at throwing events. He was the first Fijian to have success internationally in the sport of athletics. At the 1950 British Empire Games he threw  in the shot put to hold off England's Harold Moody and be declared the champion. He also claimed a silver medal in the discus behind Ian Reed of Australia, who broke the games record in the process.

He was the first gold medallist for Fiji at the Commonwealth Games and remains their only athletics winner in the tournament's history. The shot put national record of  he set in Suva in 1951 stood for over 50 years. He was the first entrant into the Fiji Sports Hall of Fame alongside rugby player Josefa Levula.

References

External links

20th-century births
20th-century deaths
People from Totoya
Fijian shot putters
Male shot putters
Fijian male athletes
Commonwealth Games gold medallists for Fiji
Commonwealth Games silver medallists for Fiji
Commonwealth Games medallists in athletics
Athletes (track and field) at the 1950 British Empire Games
Fijian male discus throwers
Medallists at the 1950 British Empire Games